The Bicester Military Railway (BMR) is a railway in Oxfordshire, England belonging to the Ministry of Defence. It links military depots at Piddington, Arncott and Graven Hill with the Oxford to Bicester Line.

History
The Bicester Military Railway was built in 1942 within the Bicester Central Ordnance Depot and was used extensively in the Second World War, particularly in the preparations for D-Day.

The Prime Minister Harold Wilson visited the BMR in mid-1965 prior to a government spending review. On his orders it was spared from the railway cutbacks that were left over from Richard Beeching’s railway review of the early 1960s. .

Railway Squadrons
The BMR has about 40 miles of standard gauge track in use. The BMR is the main base for 275 Railway Squadron, a unit of the Royal Logistic Corps. Before 1999, 275 Railway Squadron was a stand-alone Squadron. Other RLC Regiments refer to the squadron colloquially as the Railway Children. The Sub Unit recruits exclusively from the railway industry. Every soldier in the unit is a tradesman, able to drive a locomotive, operate railway signals, shunt, and do permanent way work. 

The unit's regular sister unit was 79 Railway Squadron and sometimes undertakes permanent way work with the Royal Engineers unit 507 STRE. 275 Railway Squadron's now defunct insignia is a cross section of flat bottom rail in a blue diamond. This dates back to unit's involvement with the Longmoor Military Railway.

Sources

References 

Rail transport in Oxfordshire
Military railways in the United Kingdom
Railway lines opened in 1942
Royal Logistic Corps
Bicester